Dolphins is an IMAX documentary produced in 2000. The film was nominated for an Academy Award for Best Documentary Short Subject. Directed by Greg MacGillivray, with Chris Palmer serving as executive producer, this feature follows a few scientists studying dolphins (chiefly Kathleen Dudzinski, Dean Bernal, and Alejandro Acevedo-Gutiérrez, as well as Louis Herman and Bernd Wursig) as they work to learn more about dolphins. The main focus is on research into dolphin communication and intelligence, along with some exploration of feeding habits and human interaction. Several species of dolphins are shown, primarily the bottlenose dolphin, the dusky dolphin, and the Atlantic spotted dolphin. Dolphins is narrated by Pierce Brosnan with music by Sting.

Awards and nominations

Soundtrack

Track listing

See also

List of documentary films
 List of American films of 2000

References

Further reading
Chris Palmer: Shooting in the Wild: An Insider's Account of Making Movies in the Animal Kingdom, Sierra Club Books, 2010

External links
 official website 
IMDb page
 

2000 films
2000 documentary films
American documentary films
Films about dolphins
IMAX short films
Short films directed by Greg MacGillivray
Documentary films about marine biology
Sting (musician)
MacGillivray Freeman Films films
IMAX documentary films
2000s English-language films
2000s American films